Cryptagama aurita, commonly known as the gravel dragon or hidden dragon, is a species of agamid lizard occurring in the arid north-eastern interior of Western Australia and the adjacent area of the Northern Territory. Cryptagama aurita is the only species in its genus.

Description
Adult Cryptagama aurita are very squat, with short limbs with a blunt-tipped tail that is shorter than its body. They range in colour from pale reddish brown to brick red, with pale brownish grey on its head and back. Living in areas of spinifex and gibber plains, they have evolved to mimic the look of a gibber stone.

References

Agamidae
Agamid lizards of Australia
Monotypic lizard genera
Taxa named by Geoffrey James Witten